Etherow Country Park is situated at Compstall, England, between Marple Bridge and Romiley, in the Metropolitan Borough of Stockport, Greater Manchester. It is a Local Nature Reserve and the starting point of the Goyt Way.

It was one of England's first country parks. Originally it was an industrial area incorporating a mine, a mill and a mill pond. The River Etherow flows through the park and is the source for the mill pond. With the decline of industry, the mill pond and park have become a nature reserve and a place for people to spend time walking and taking in the peaceful surroundings.

Reserve 

Compstall Nature Reserve is a  region of the park which is designated a Site of Special Scientific Interest (SSSI). The area was designated an SSSI in 1977 for its biological interest, in particular its wide range of habitats including open water, tall fen, reed swamp, carr and mixed deciduous woodland. The site is also of considerable ornithological interest with water rail, an uncommon species, having been recorded.

Etherow Country Park has many local groups associated with it. Etherow Country Park Sailing Club is a small sailing club which has good results nationally; in 2014 it finished 17th of 64 entrants in the Southport 24 Hour Race. The Friends of Etherow are a small local community group; other groups include the anglers and the model boaters.

References

External links
 Map of Compstall Nature Reserve SSSI
Etherow Country Park website

Tourist attractions in the Metropolitan Borough of Stockport
Parks and commons in the Metropolitan Borough of Stockport
Country parks in Greater Manchester
Sites of Special Scientific Interest in Greater Manchester
Local Nature Reserves in Greater Manchester